WTRC-FM (95.3 MHz; "News Talk 95.3 MNC") is a commercial radio station, licensed to Niles, Michigan and  featuring a news/talk format. The station's owner is Federated Media. Its programming and on-air presentation are closely patterned after Federated's news/talk station in Fort Wayne, WOWO. The station broadcasts syndicated programming, including Dan Bongino, Brian Kilmeade, and Sean Hannity. WTRC-FM is a Fox News Radio affiliate.

WTRC-FM is licensed by the FCC to broadcast in the HD Radio digital hybrid format.

History

The station first began broadcasting as WNIL-FM. Before adopting the current format, it had a classic rock format as WAOR. (Following the change in formats the WAOR call letters, along with the classic rock format, moved to 95.7 FM (now WRDI).)

After changing its call letters to WTRC-FM, the station switched to a news/talk format that was simulcast over WTRC, AM 1340 in Elkhart, Indiana. On May 5, 2014, WTRC and WTRC-FM began broadcasting separate morning shows, although the two stations continued to jointly broadcast most other programming. On February 21, 2017 WTRC changed its format to adult standards, ending its WTRC-FM simulcasts.

References

External links

TRC
News and talk radio stations in the United States